Yidiiltoo or Yidįįłtoo are the traditional face tattoos of Hän Gwich’in women, who are indigenous to Alaska and Canada.

History 
The practice dates back at least 10,000 years. Traditionally girls of the Hän Gwich’in receive their first tattoos between the ages of 12 and 14, often at first menstruation. Missionaries of the 1800s and 1900s banned the traditional practice along with other cultural traditions.  

Starting in the 2010s, some indigenous girls and women began to reclaim the tradition.

Description 
Typical markings include vertical lines from lower lip that extend to beneath the chin. According to tattoo anthropologist Lars Krutak, the width of the lines and the spacing between them were traditionally associated with which of the nine groups of Hän Gwich’in the girl was from. 

Other markings may be created on the temple or cheeks.

Method of application 
The traditional method is a stick-and-poke using needles made from bird bones. Some modern practitioners use tattoo needles.

Notable wearers 

 Quannah Chasinghorse, a model of Hän Gwich’in and Sicangu Oglala Lakota heritage, received her first Yidįįłtoo at age 14.

Appropriation 
Some non-indigenous people wear temporary markings, makeup or jewelry that mimics the traditional Yidįįłtoo. Angelina Jolie was criticized for wearing facial jewelry that mimicked Yidįįłtoo.

See also 

 Kakiniit
 Tavlugun

References 

Tattooing traditions
Gwich'in